The St. Stanislaus Catholic Church, at 633 5th Ave. in Lewiston, Idaho, was built in 1905.  It was designed by Lewiston architect James H. Nave and was built by the Dubray Brothers.  It was listed on the National Register of Historic Places in 1978.

References

External links

Roman Catholic churches in Idaho
National Register of Historic Places in Nez Perce County, Idaho
Gothic Revival architecture in Idaho
Roman Catholic churches completed in 1905
1905 establishments in Idaho
20th-century Roman Catholic church buildings in the United States